Datuk Armizan bin Mohd Ali (Jawi: ارميزان بن محمد علي; born 9 September 1976) is a Malaysian politician who has served as Minister in the Prime Minister's Department charged with Sabah and Sarawak affairs since December 2022.

Election results

Honours

Honours of Malaysia
 :
  Knight Companion of the Order of the Crown of Pahang (DIMP) - Dato' (2016)
 :
 Justice of Peace (JP) (2010)
  Member of the Order of Kinabalu (ADK) (2008)
  Commander of the Order of Kinabalu (PGDK) - Datuk (2022)

References 

1976 births
Living people
Malaysian people of Malay descent
Malaysian Muslims
People from Sabah
International Islamic University Malaysia alumni
Former United Malays National Organisation politicians
21st-century Malaysian politicians
Commanders of the Order of Kinabalu